Leyden is an unincorporated community located in the town of Janesville, Rock County, Wisconsin, United States.

History
A post office called Leyden was established in 1850, and remained in operation until it was discontinued in 1903. The community was named after Leiden, in the Netherlands.

Notes

Unincorporated communities in Rock County, Wisconsin
Unincorporated communities in Wisconsin